Abdullah Pashe Taushani of Elbasan was a member of the Ali Pasha Tepelena's  Supreme Council of the Armed Forces.  Other members of the Council included Myftar Pasha, Veli Pasha, Xheladin bej Ohri and a number of his trusted men like Hasan Dervishi, Halil Patrona, Omar Vrioni, Meço Bono, Ago Myhyrdari, Thanasis Vagias, Veli Gega and Tahir Abazi.

Between 1812 and 1813, Abdullah Pasha, in the capacity of Sanjakbey of Elbasan (roughly equivalent to "district governor"), engaged in the process of the hygienization of the city by cleaning the water and sewage canals that originated from inside Elbasan Castle and finally depositing them in the Shkumbin river.

See also
 Taushani family

References

19th-century Albanian politicians
People from Elbasan
Ali Pasha of Ioannina